Sandstone Branch Railway (also known as the Black Range railway) was a branch railway line between Mount Magnet and Sandstone in the Mid West region of Western Australia.

History 
It was built in 1910, and closed in 1949; it was lifted in 1950.

Route 
It was connected to the Mullewa – Meekatharra railway at Mount Magnet.

Locations on line 
 Mount Magnet –   (from Perth)
 Warrambu – 
 Mount Ford – 
 Paynesville  
 Intersection with No 1 Rabbit Proof Fence at 
 Anketell –  
 Jundoo –  
 Sandstone – 

An interactive map of the Sandstone line is available at OpenStreetMap.

Proposed link to Leonora 
Such a connection would have created a loop line linking the Northern Railway with the Eastern Goldfields Railway. The proposal was not successful.

Reputation of branch line
The railway was considered by the railway commissioner of the time in the mid-1930s to be the worst railway in Western Australia.
 
Post-Second World War austerity issues were given as part of reason for closing in 1948 due to shortage of  rails for the required repairs to remain open.

Goods shed 
The Sandstone railway goods shed built in 1910 was considered to be of heritage significance, having survived long after closing of the line.

Notes

Closed railway lines in Western Australia
Railway lines opened in 1910
Railway lines closed in 1949
Shire of Sandstone